Nathan Santos de Araújo (born 5 September 2001), known as Nathan Santos or just Nathan, is a Brazilian professional footballer who plays as a right-back for Santos.

Club career

Early career
Born in Rio de Janeiro, Nathan joined Vasco da Gama's youth setup in May 2017, from Portuguesa-RJ; the transfer was controversial, as Vasco only registered his contract in June 2018, and later denied Portuguesa's claim over a 30% sell-on clause. In January 2019, Spanish club Valencia made an offer for him, but the move never materialized.

Nathan featured as an unused substitute for the main squad of Vasco in two matches of the 2020 Campeonato Carioca.

Boavista
On 13 September 2020, Nathan moved abroad for the first time in his career, after agreeing to a one-year loan deal with Primeira Liga side Boavista, with an obligation to buy. He made his professional debut thirteen days later, replacing Jesús Alejandro Gómez late into a 5–0 home loss to FC Porto.

After making 15 appearances overall in his first season, Nathan signed a permanent deal until June 2025 on 30 June 2021. He established himself as a regular during the 2021–22 campaign, and scored his first professional goal on 16 December 2021, netting his team's fourth in a 5–1 home routing of Braga, in the Taça da Liga.

Santos
On 5 August 2022, Nathan returned to his home country after signing a contract with Série A side Santos until December 2026. He made his debut for the club exactly one month later, replacing Madson in a 2–1 home loss against Goiás.

Career statistics

References

External links
 

2001 births
Living people
Footballers from Rio de Janeiro (city)
Brazilian footballers
Association football fullbacks
Campeonato Brasileiro Série A players
CR Vasco da Gama players
Santos FC players
Primeira Liga players
Boavista F.C. players
Brazilian expatriate footballers
Brazilian expatriate sportspeople in Portugal
Expatriate footballers in Portugal